, also known as Hajimete no Gal, is a Japanese manga series by Meguru Ueno. It has been serialized in Kadokawa Shoten's shōnen manga magazine Monthly Shōnen Ace since November 2015, and has been collected in sixteen tankōbon volumes. A ten-episode anime television series adaptation produced by NAZ aired from July to September 2017.

Plot
High school boy Junichi Hashiba laments not having a girlfriend as his classmates have seemed to be pairing up everywhere. His single unattached friends force him into boldly confessing his love to Yukana Yame, a beautiful "gal" at the school. Although Yukana easily determines that Junichi really just wants to lose his virginity, she agrees to be his girlfriend. Junichi soon attracts the affections of other girls who have known Junichi or Yukana for a while, including his childhood friend and neighbor Nene Fujinoki, Yukana's gal friend Ranko Honjō, and the school's madonna Yui Kashī.

Characters

 Junichi is a second-year high school boy who wishes to have a girlfriend. At the start of the series, he is set up by his friends to confess his love to Yukana Yame. While he is internally thrilled to see Yukana's sexy body, he is easily embarrassed when Yukana confronted him for such lewd actions. He regularly has sexual fantasies of losing his virginity and is depicted as having internal debates in his head over what to do in situations. His friends also pressure him to hook them up with girls. As he learns that Yukana does indeed like him, he tries to remain loyal to her, turning down the other girls that make advances on him.

 Yukana is a fashionable high school "gal" with strawberry blonde hair, green eyes, a busty chest, loose socks, and a carefree attitude. She was very guarded about lewd stuff, calling it gross, but agrees to be Junichi's girlfriend. She finds Junichi to be transparent with his emotions and reactions, and often calls Junichi out for being a lewd virgin who is interested in her body, but teases and flirts with him too. Underneath she is very caring, and seeks her friends' advice often on how to relate to Jun better, being a little naive sometimes on applying the advice. On occasion, she lowers her guard and lets him touch her if it helps affirm how committed she is to the relationship. She gets jealous of the other girls that flirt with Junichi, except for Nene, who she thinks her little sister behavior is too cute to be taken seriously.

 Yukana's childhood friend is a tall tan-skinned gal with short light blonde hair, light purple eyes, and a big chest. She is very aggressive, making moves on Junichi which makes Yukana jealous. She reveals to Junichi that she loves Yukana and is possessive of her; she does not like Yukana being so close to Junichi, even if it means having to have sex with Junichi herself.

 A petite but big-breasted first-year high school girl who styles her hair in buns. She and Junichi are childhood friends, but she is obsessed with Junichi, and initially tried to dress and act like a little sister because he had expressed interest in that genre of video games. She briefly tries the gal lifestyle to try to win Junichi over, and later tries to attack him by lying on top of him naked in bed, but Junichi rejects her. She then decides to openly compete with Yukana, going back to her bun hairstyle. In the anime, Junichi's friends regard her as a "loli with big boobs".

 Junichi's classmate and class representative, who has long dark hair and reddish eyes. Junichi's friends regard her as the school's madonna, smart and beautiful, like a character from a manga or a video game, but with a modest chest size compared to the other girls. She has known Jun since middle school and initially acts very friendly and nice around him. She secretly dresses up as a blonde-haired (red hair in the anime) twin-tailed idol named BoA who does live streams on the internet. She is upset that Junichi, whom she deems her number-one servant because he had helped carry boxes for her or picked up her eraser, does not fawn over her like an obedient pet because he is with Yukana. She tries to remedy that by pulling him aside and asking him to dump Yukana and go out with her. When Jun refuses, she gets very angry and threatens him until Ranko saves him by threatening to reveal her net identity. She becomes more attracted to Junichi beyond just wanting him to be her pet, and eventually confesses to Junichi and is rejected. She then strives to be his second girlfriend as in a harem, even following the two to university.

 A glasses-wearing classmate with short bluish hair who is part of Junichi's group of perverted friends.  He, Junichi, and Yui were classmates before in middle school. He is the one who usually initiates the plans and recommendations for Junichi, including planning the confession, giving movie tickets to Junichi, and others. He is also the first to make the connection between Yui and online idol named BoA. Shinpei has an older cousin named Sayaka, who attends university and is involved in a manga club.

 A blonde-haired classmate who is part of Junichi's group of perverted friends.

 An obese classmate who is part of Junichi's group of perverted friends. Of the three friends, he mentions that he likes little girls.

 Yukana's gal friend with medium brown hair and blue eyes. She is more of a background character in the manga, but has a larger role in the anime.

 Yukana's gal friend with blonde hair stylized in tails tied with red ribbons. She is more of a background character in the manga, but has a larger role in the anime.
 Yuki Kashī
 Yui's younger brother who dresses up as an attractive girl at school, flirting with and teasing Junichi. Yuki is very fond of Yui, but when he notices she has been off because of her love for Junichi, he tries to support her and disrupt Junichi's relationship with Yukana. This is so that Yui can return to being the strong older sister.
 Iris Kotohayashi
 The student council president who dislikes that Junichi has attracted a harem of pretty girls at school. She has long blonde hair, and is part French and part Japanese. She has a reputation of imprisoning students like in the Prison School manga.
 Kiyo Gokomachi
 Junichi's next-door neighbor at university. They share a wall in the apartment comlpex but it is so poorly constructed it breaks into a hole.
 Karin Kurihama
 A first-year student who joins Junichi in the otaku research club at university. She has light hair and a cheery attitude. She aspires to be a manga artist, and recruits him to teach her about putting romance into her manga.
 Omae Sakurako 
 President of the otaku research club at university.

Media

Manga
As of February 2023, the series has been released in sixteen tankōbon volumes.

Anime
A 10-episode anime television series adaptation by NAZ aired from July 12 to September 13, 2017. The series was directed and character designed by Hiroyuki Furukawa, who also did the erotic comedy My Wife is the Student Council President. The script was supervised by Yuichiro Momose, and the music was done by Yashikin of MAGES. An OVA episode was released on December 26, 2017. 

Funimation licensed and streamed the series in North America with an English dub, while Crunchyroll streamed it in Japanese with English subtitles. Following Sony's acquisition of Crunchyroll, the dub was moved to Crunchyroll.

Reception
The anime's first episode was reviewed by various writers at Anime News Network. James Beckett found that the fanservice to be as expected and that it embodied "all of the most irritating sex comedy stereotypes that stopped being funny back when the American Pie sequels fizzled out over a decade ago." Nick Creamer found the censorship bars to be the only unique thing about the show, and that the central characters were not likable. Theron Martin held out some hope that Yukana would at least have some character depth. Paul Jensen found the premise of two characters from different social circles to have potential, but the first episode to be obnoxious and dumb, outside of some moments where Yukana reacts to Junichi's confession. Rebecca Silverman regarded the episode as mostly fetishism and unless that was toned down and "starts to develop Yukana as a real person, it could be a somewhat smarty raunchy comedy," but did not plan to watch any more to find out.

Explanatory notes

Works cited
 "Ch." is shortened form for chapter and refers to a chapter number of the Hajimete no Gal manga
 "Ep." is shortened form for episode and refers to an episode number of the My First Girlfriend Is a Gal anime

See also
 Does a Hot Elf Live Next Door to You?, another manga series by the same author
 Gal-sen, another manga series by the same author

References

External links
 

2017 anime television series debuts
Anime series based on manga
Crunchyroll anime
Harem anime and manga
Gyaru in fiction
Kadokawa Dwango franchises
Kadokawa Shoten manga
Medialink
Naz (studio)
Romantic comedy anime and manga
School life in anime and manga
Shōnen manga
Slice of life anime and manga
Works about virginity